The Atterbury Theatre is a multi-genre concert venue seating 400 and located on the corner of Lynnwood Road and Daventry Street in eastern Pretoria, South Africa, part of the Lynnwood Bridge Retail shopping center. The theatre opened on May 18, 2011, with the musical Stuur Groete aan Mannetjies Roux. The theatre serves as a ground floor piazza alongside the four separate store buildings. Studio 3 Architects International, the firm that designed the theatre, was the National Winner of the Saint-Gobain Gypsum International Trophy in the Innovation category, for the use of certain products in the design of the theatre ceiling. It was developed by the Atterbury Group.

References 

Buildings and structures in Pretoria
Culture of the City of Tshwane
Theatres in South Africa
Theatres completed in 2011
2011 establishments in South Africa
21st-century architecture in South Africa